V, (stylized as BRVNX) is the fifth studio album by American hardcore punk band The Bronx, excluding the three albums they recorded under the Mariachi El Bronx name. It was released in September 2017 under ATO Records.

Track listing

Critical reception 

V received mixed to positive reviews from music critics. On review aggregator website, Metacritic, V received an average critic score of 66 out of 100 indicating "generally favorable reviews".

Charts

Accolades

References

2017 albums
The Bronx (band) albums
ATO Records albums